Edward Retilla Hays (May 26, 1847 – February 28, 1896) was a nineteenth-century politician, soldier, and lawyer from Ohio and Iowa, who briefly represented Iowa's 7th congressional district in the U.S. House of Representatives.

Biography
Born in Fostoria, Ohio, Hays attended rural schools near Tiffin, Ohio, as a child. During the Civil War, he served as a private in the 1st Ohio Heavy Artillery Regiment from 1862 to 1865.

Afterwards, he studied law and was admitted to the bar in 1869, commencing practice in Knoxville, Iowa. He served on the local school board and on the City Council.

In September 1890, less than two months before the general election, Republican U.S. Representative Edwin H. Conger resigned his Congressional seat representing Iowa's 7th congressional district to accept President Benjamin Harrison's appointment as United States Ambassador to Brazil. Iowa Governor Horace Boies added to the already-scheduled November 1890 election ballot a special election to choose an immediate successor who would complete the final months of Conger's term.  Hays was chosen as the Republican nominee for this special election.  After winning the election on November 4, 1890 by 2,560 votes, he served in a second session that began in December 1890 and ended on March 3, 1891.

Returning from Washington, he resumed practicing law until his death in Knoxville, on February 28, 1896. He was interred in Graceland Cemetery in Knoxville.

References

External links

 Retrieved on 2008-10-10

1847 births
1896 deaths
Iowa lawyers
Union Army soldiers
People from Fostoria, Ohio
People of Ohio in the American Civil War
People from Knoxville, Iowa
Republican Party members of the United States House of Representatives from Iowa
19th-century American politicians
19th-century American lawyers
Child soldiers in the American Civil War